33rd meridian may refer to:

33rd meridian east, a line of longitude east of the Greenwich Meridian
33rd meridian west, a line of longitude west of the Greenwich Meridian